Bellingshausen Plain, also known as Bellinghausen Abyssal Plain, is an undersea plain parallel to the continental rise in the Bellingshausen Sea, named for Admiral Fabian Gottlieb von Bellingshausen, commander of the Russian Antarctic Expedition (1818–1821). The name was approved by the Advisory Committee for Undersea Features in April 1974.

References
 

Abyssal plains of the Southern Ocean